The Indian Hotels Company Limited (IHCL) is an Indian hospitality company that manages a portfolio of hotels, resorts, jungle safaris, palaces, spas and in-flight catering services. The company is part of India's Tata Group. IHCL was founded in 1899 by Jamsetji Tata and is headquartered in Mumbai where its flagship hotel Taj Mahal Palace Hotel is also located. It has more than 250 hotels in 107 locations across 4 continents and in 10 countries, with over 21,000 rooms, across brands like Taj, Vivanta, SeleQtions, The Gateway and Ginger.

History 

The company was founded by Tata Group founder and industrialist Jamshedji Tata. He incorporated Indian Hotels Company Limited in 1899 and registered in 1902. The first hotel of the company was opened — The Taj Mahal Palace Hotel in Colaba neighbourhood of Mumbai was opened in 1903. It was the first five star hotel in India with modern elevators and Russian carpets.

In 1980 the Taj Group opened their first international hotels: the Taj Sheba Hotel in Sana'a, Yemen and the Taj Pamodzi in Lusaka, Zambia. IHCL entered the Sri Lankan market with Taj Exotica Bentota and Taj Samudra in Colombo. In joint venture with G. V. Krishna Reddy, Taj Hotels form Taj GVK which started mega scale businesses in Hyderabad with Taj Banjara, Taj Krishna and Taj Deccan. IHCL entered Middle Eastern market with opening a hotel in Dubai — the Taj Palace Hotel Dubai. Next year the company opened three more hotels — the Regent Hotel in Mumbai, Rawal-Kot in Jaisalmer and Usha Kiran Palace in Gwalior.

The company planned to open hotels in Jamshedpur and Ranchi. Taj Surya was opened in Coimbatore and later renamed as Vivanta. Every brand of IHCL built hotels in every major city of India.

IHCL also operates TajSATS Air Catering, in a joint venture with SATS (formerly known as Singapore Airport Terminal Services). In May 2017, IHCL announced it was moving all of its hotels under a unique brand, Taj Hotels Palaces Resorts Safaris. The brands Vivanta by Taj and Gateway were merged into a single business unit. During the summer of 2017, Cyrus Mistry stated that some of the group's latest costly acquisitions (Sea Rock Hotel, The Pierre in New York, Taj Boston) "destroyed the economic value of the company". The unique brand decision was reversed in 2018.

In April 2018, the group opened its first location in Saudi Arabia through a partnership with the Umm al-Qura construction company. In April 2019, IHCL launched the hotel brand SeleQtions with 12 location openings. In May 2019, IHCL signed a strategic partnership with GIC Private Limited (Singapore's sovereign wealth fund) to acquire 600 million dollars' worth of hotel assets over three years.

Brands

Notable Hotels

Philanthropy 
IHCL have partnered with UNESCO to safeguard the intangible cultural heritage in India. Taj Welfare Trust distributed nutritious meals to doctors in Delhi, Mumbai and Bangalore.

Gallery

See also 

 List of hotels in India
 List of chained-brand hotels

References

External links 
 

Companies based in Mumbai
Indian companies established in 1899
Indian companies established in 1902
Hospitality companies established in 1899
Hospitality companies of India
Hospitality companies
Indian Hotels Company Limited
Companies listed on the National Stock Exchange of India
Companies listed on the Bombay Stock Exchange